Indira is an 2022 Indian Tamil-language television drama airing on Zee Tamil and is also available on the digital platform ZEE5. Based on Bengali-language Zee Bangla's drama series Aparajita Apu, it tells a story of a Indira, a small-town patriarchial family, Indira faces gender discrimination but resolves to fight it and become an IAS officer to earn respect. Will her determination help her fulfil her dream. It airs Monday to Saturday at 1PM.

It premiered on 21 November 2022 and produced by Aran Hari  under the banner of Spectraa Productions. The series stars Fouziee Hidhayah, Akshay Kamal, Gowtham and Akhila Krishnan.

Cast

Main
 Fouzil Hidhayah as Indira
 Is a young and passionate girl. She aspires to achieve her dream and become a IAS officer.
 Akshay Kamal as Gowtham
 A calm and disciplined man and Jayalakshmi`s son.

Recurring 
 Merwen as Kathir
 Akhila Krishnan as Raagini
 Premi Venkat as Jayalaskhmi
 Kavya
 Jeevitha
 Jeyalakshmi
 Ragini

Adaptations

References

External links
 Indira at ZEE5

Zee Tamil original programming
Television shows set in Tamil Nadu
Tamil-language romance television series
Tamil-language melodrama television series
2022 Tamil-language television series debuts
Tamil-language television series based on Bengali-languages television series
Tamil-language television soap operas
Tamil-language television shows